The 2020 season was the 70th season of competitive association football in China.

National teams

China national football team

Results and fixtures

China women's national football team

Results and fixtures

Olympic Qualifying Tournament

AFC competitions

AFC Champions League

AFC Champions League qualifying play-offs round

Play-off round

|}

Group stage

Group E

Group F

Group G

Group H

Knockout stage

Round of 16

|}

Quarter-finals

|}

Men's football

Super League

Regular season

Group A

Group B

Championship stage

Relegation stage

League One

Regular season

Group A

Group B

Group C

Championship stage

Group D

Relegation stage

Group E

Group F

League Two

Regular season

Group A

Group B

Women's football

Super League

Regular season

Championship stage

Relegation stage

Football League

League Two

Managerial changes
This is a list of changes of managers within Chinese professional league football:

Chinese Super League

China League One

Notes

References

 
2020 sport-related lists
China